Joonas is an Estonian and Finnish given name, a cognate of Jonas and may refer to:
 Joonas Alanne (born 1990), Finnish ice hockey player
 Joonas Angeria (born 1989), Finnish music producer, songwriter and musician
 Joonas Cavén (born 1993),  Finnish basketball player
 Joonas Donskoi (born 1992), Finnish ice hockey player
 Joonas Granberg (born 1986), Finnish golfer
 Joonas Hallikainen (born 1985), Finnish ice hockey player
 Joonas Henttala (born 1991), Finnish racing cyclist
 Joonas Hurri (born 1991), Finnish ice hockey player
 Joonas Ikäläinen (born 1982), Finnish footballer
 Joonas Jääskeläinen (born 1973), Finnish ice hockey player
 Joonas Jalvanti (born 1988), Finnish ice hockey player
 Joonas Järveläinen (born 1990), Estonian basketball player
 Joonas Järvinen (born 1989), Finnish ice hockey player
 Joonas Kemppainen (born 1988), Finnish ice hockey player
 Joonas Kokkonen (1921–1996), Finnish composer
 Joonas Kolkka (born 1974), Finnish footballer
 Joonas Komulainen (born 1990), Finnish ice hockey player
 Joonas Korpisalo (born 1994), Finnish ice hockey player
 Joonas Koskinen (born 1987), Finnish ice hockey player
 Joonas Kuusela (born 1990), Finnish ice hockey player
 Joonas Kylmäkorpi (born 1980), Finnish motorcycle speedway rider
 Joonas Laurikainen (born 1983), Finnish footballer
 Joonas Lehtivuori (born 1988), Finnish ice hockey player
 Joonas Liimatainen (born 1991), Finnish ice hockey player
 Joonas Lindgren (born 1986), Finnish sailor and Olympic competitor
 Joonas Myyrä (1892–1955), Finnish javelin thrower
 Joonas Nättinen (born 1991), Finnish ice hockey player
 Joonas Pöntinen (born 1990), Finnish footballer
 Joonas Rask (born 1990), Finnish ice hockey player
 Joonas Riekkinen (born 1987), Finnish ice hockey player
 Joonas Riismaa (born 2002), Estonian basketball player
 Joonas Ronnberg (born 1983), Finnish ice hockey player
 Joonas Sammalmaa (born 1991), Finnish ice hockey player
 Joonas Sarelius (born 1979), Finnish footballer
 Joonas Sildre (born 1980), Estonian comics artist, illustrator and graphic designer
 Joonas Suotamo (born 1986), Finnish actor and former basketball player
 Joonas Tamm (born 1992), Estonian footballer
 Joonas Toivanen (born 1991), Finnish ice hockey player
 Joonas Vaino (born 1992), Estonian basketball player
 Joonas Valkonen (born 1993), Finnish ice hockey player
 Joonas Vihko (born 1981), Finnish ice hockey player

As a surname
Velly Joonas (born 1955), Estonian musician, songwriter and poet

References

Finnish masculine given names
Estonian masculine given names